"Wheels of Fortune" is a song written by Patrick Simmons, Jeff Baxter and John Hartman.  It was first released by the Doobie Brothers on their 1976 album Takin' It to the Streets.  It was also released as the second single from the album.

Lyrics and Music
According to Billboard Magazine, "Wheels of Fortune" has a similar theme to Blood, Sweat & Tears' 1969 single "Spinning Wheel."  The lyrics describe how the wheels of fortune keep changing so that sometimes you lose and sometimes you win.

Nevada State Journal critic Pat O'Driscoll found "Wheels of Fortune" to be generally in the typical Doobie Brothers' style, with "layers of strumming rhythm guitars", but that it also incorporated jazz elements.  J. Greg Robertson of the Hartford Courant similarly found the song to be in the Doobie Brothers' traditional style, with "fast tempo, multiple drumming, standard guitar riffs and group vocals."  On the other hand, David Guo of the Pittsburgh Post-Gazette remarked that the song's "warbling and syncopated rhythms" were reminiscent of Steely Dan.  Likewise, Terry Anderson of The Daily Journal heard jazz influences from Steely Dan.  Allmusic critic Bruce Eder also saw "Wheels of Fortune" as an example of the Doobie Brothers being influenced by Steely Dan.

Patrick Simmons and Tom Johnston shared the lead vocals on "Wheels of Fortune."  This was one of Johnston's last lead vocal performances for the Doobie Brothers before being forced to leave the band due to health reasons.

Reception
"Wheels of Fortune" was released as the second single from Takin' It to the Streets as a follow up to the title song.  Although the previous single reached #13 on the Billboard Hot 100, "Wheels of Fortune" was far less successful, peaking at #87.

Billboard rated "Wheels of Fortune as a "worthy follow-up to 'Taking It To The Streets,'" describing it as combining "funky instrumental tracks and country-rockish vocalizing into a stunning sound."  Los Angeles Times critic Steve Pond found that although it incorporates new elements for the band such as the Steely Dan influences, it was "every bit as appealing as the early hits the Doobies once seemed content to merely rewrite."  Despite its lack of chart success, Brian Kay of Classic Rock History rated "Wheels of Fortune" as the Doobie Brothers all-time greatest song, praising its composition, production values and performance.  Chris Epting of Ultimate Classic Rock described the song as "powerful."

Other Appearances
"Wheels of Fortune" was included on the 2007 compilation album The Very Best of the Doobie Brothers.

The Doobie Brothers played "Wheels of Fortune" on Dinah! on July 24, 1976.

Personnel
The Doobie Brothers
Patrick Simmons – rhythm guitar, lead and backing vocals
Tom Johnston – co-lead vocals
Jeff "Skunk" Baxter – lead guitar
Michael McDonald – electric piano, backing vocals
Tiran Porter – bass, backing vocals
John Hartman – drums
Keith Knudsen – backing vocals

Additional personnel
The Memphis Horns – horns
Richie Hayward – drums
Ted Templeman – percussion

References

The Doobie Brothers songs
1976 songs
1976 singles
Songs written by Patrick Simmons
Song recordings produced by Ted Templeman
Warner Records singles